Robert Luther Gauldin, Jr. (born 1931) is an American composer. He is Professor Emeritus of Music Theory at the Eastman School of Music.

Career 
Robert Gauldin was born to Robert Luther Gauldin (1905–1959) and Lula Mae Self (1905–1977). He graduated in 1949 from Vernon High School, Vernon, Texas. During his senior year, he was Vice President of the Honor Society and, as clarinetist, President of the Band. In the 1949 Vernon High School Yearbook, he was labeled "the BEBOP man."

Gauldin, in 1952, earned a Bachelor of Music degree in Composition, with High Honors, from the University of North Texas College of Music. He went on to study at the Eastman School of Music where, in 1956, he earned a Master of Music degree in Music Theory, and in 1959, a PhD in Music Theory. From 1959 to 1963 he served as professor of theory at William Carey College. For the next thirty-four years – from 1963 to 1997 – he was a professor at Eastman School of Music.{{Sfn|Marquis, World,|2007|p=}}

CompositionsMovement for Wind Quintet (©1953)
   (audio via YouTube).

Publications
Gauldin is the author of Harmonic Practice in Tonal Music and has authored many articles in publications that including Journal of Music Theory Pedagogy, Music Theory Spectrum, Journal of the American Liszt Society and Sonus''.

 
   & .
  
   ; .

  , ; ; ; ; .
  ; ; ; 
  ; ; ; ; .

 *Also peer reviewed

Honors
 1988 – Honorary doctorate, College of William & Mary
 1988 – In connection with the honorary doctorate, Gauldin was R.T. French Company Visiting Professor at Oxford University's Worcester College
 1952 – First Prize, Student Composition, Texas Federation of Music Clubs – Sonatina
 1952 – BMI Student Composer Award
 1964 – Winner of the 1954 Music Mountain Contest for works by American composers for string quartet – Partita in Four Movements: Intrada; Scherzo; Passecaille; and Rondo

Bibliography

Annotations

Notes

References

  ; ; .

 

 

  ; ; .
 
 

  ; ; .

  .
 
 
 

  ;  .

  

  

  

  

  .

External links
 

People from Vernon, Texas
American male classical composers
American classical composers
21st-century classical composers
Eastman School of Music alumni
University of North Texas College of Music alumni
Eastman School of Music faculty
1931 births
Living people
American music educators
Place of birth missing (living people)
21st-century American composers
21st-century American male musicians